The Empresa Nacional de Energía Eléctrica (also commonly known as ENEE), is Honduras's government owned and operated electrical power company, operating within the Electricity sector in Honduras.

By the numbers 
 ENEE employs more than 4,500 people.
 ENEE serves 1.3 million households and more than one hundred thousand of commercial and industrial customers.
 ENEE covers 84.8% of Honduras' electricity demand (June 2012).

History 
The organization was created on February 20, 1957, as an autonomous organization responsible for the production, transmission, distribution and commercialization of electrical energy in Honduras.

The first large-scale project was the first hydroelectric power station, Cañaveral, which included the construction of transmission lines and substations in order to distribute its generated power to the final consumers. The so-called National Interconnected System continued to expand and now covers most main regions throughout the country. In 1985 the Francisco Morazán Hydroelectric Project (El Cajón Dam) was completed at a cost of US$775 million.

After recently changing over to smart meters, electricity bills have increases three-fold.

Private energy suppliers 
 Lufussa
 EMCE
 ENERSA

See also 
 Hondutel

References

External links 
  
 
 Honduras Electricity Statistics
 Saving El Cajon

Electric power companies of Honduras
Government of Honduras